East Bank High School was a public high school in East Bank, West Virginia in Kanawha County. Its teams competed as the Pioneers. It closed in 1999 in a consolidation with Dupont High School to form Riverside High School.

Jerry West played basketball for the high school. It was established in 1912 and originally known as Cabin Creek District High School.

West won a state championship with the East Bank High School basketball team and graduated in 1956. He was photographed with the team by DeLuze Studio in Charleston, West Virginia. A crowd celebrating the state championship was photographed in front of the school. West was the first high school player in West Virginia history to score 900 points in a season.

The football team won several state championships.

A historical marker commemorates the school's history. The yearbook was called the Kanawahan. Alumnus Don Stamper helped build a half-court basketball court on the site of the school.

References

Schools in Kanawha County, West Virginia
Educational institutions established in 1912
1912 establishments in West Virginia
Educational institutions disestablished in 1999
1999 disestablishments in the United States